Alexander Pronkov is a Russian Paralympic cross country skier from Kozlovka village, Penza Oblast, Russia. who won a gold medal in the 10 km freestyle race at the 2014 Winter Paralympics.

He won the bronze medal in the men's 12.5km standing cross-country skiing event at the 2021 World Para Snow Sports Championships held in Lillehammer, Norway. In biathlon, he won the silver medal in the men's 6km standing event. He also won the silver medal in the men's 10km standing biathlon event.

References

External links
 

Living people
20th-century births
Sportspeople from Penza
Cross-country skiers at the 2014 Winter Paralympics
Paralympic gold medalists for Russia
Date of birth missing (living people)
Medalists at the 2014 Winter Paralympics
Russian male cross-country skiers
Year of birth missing (living people)
Paralympic medalists in cross-country skiing
Paralympic cross-country skiers of Russia